Van Dooren is a toponymic surname of Dutch origin and a variation of the more common Van Doorn. Notable people with the surname include:

Bas van Dooren (born 1973), Dutch mountain biker.
Frans van Dooren (1934–2005), Dutch poet and writer
Gonzague Vandooren (born 1979), Belgian footballer
Jules Vandooren (1908–1985), French footballer
Kurt Van Dooren (born 1978), Belgian footballer
Ralph van Dooren (born 1981), Dutch footballer

See also
 Van Doorn
 Van Doorne
 Van Doren
 Van Dorn

Dutch-language surnames
Surnames of Dutch origin
Toponymic surnames